Sebastiano Mazzara (born 13 May 1975) is a former Italian male long-distance runner who competed at two editions of the IAAF World Cross Country Championships at senior level (1996, 1999), and one of the IAAF World Half Marathon Championships (1999).

References

External links
 Sebastiano Mazzara profile at Association of Road Racing Statisticians

1975 births
Living people
Italian male long-distance runners
Italian male cross country runners